Dawn Jean Acton (born 15 March 1977) is an English actress, known for portraying the role of Tracy Barlow in the ITV soap opera Coronation Street between 1988 and 1999. She left the soap opera at age 22, after having her baby son.

As a child, she attended Stamford High School in Ashton-under-Lyne and trained at the Oldham Theatre Workshop.

As of present, Dawn is working as a DJ and has been DJing for over 15 years, as well as being involved in charity work for local organisations.

References

External links
 

English soap opera actresses
People from Ashton-under-Lyne
Actors from Lancashire
English women DJs
1977 births
Living people